The Best of Anita Baker is a compilation album by the American R&B/soul singer Anita Baker. It was released on June 18, 2002, in the United States by Rhino Records, and compiles material from Baker's career spanning 1983–2002. As of March 2004, the album has sold 402,000 copies and been certified Gold by the RIAA. Anita Baker is the highest selling female artist of the 80's spanning over 7 number one hits and selling 86 million records worldwide.

The album was released in the UK as Sweet Love: The Very Best of Anita Baker, with a slightly different track listing and running order.

The Best of Anita Baker  track listing 
 Angel (Single Version) (From The Songstress, 1983) - 4:29
 You're the Best Thing Yet (From The Songstress) - 5:36
 No More Tears (From The Songstress) - 5:35
 Sweet Love (From Rapture, 1986) - 4:22
 Caught Up in the Rapture (Single Version) (From Rapture) - 4:08
 You Bring Me Joy (From Rapture) - 4:24
 Same Ole Love (365 Days a Year) (From Rapture) - 4:03
 No One in the World (From Rapture) - 4:10
 Ain't No Need to Worry (Single Version) (Featuring The Winans) (From The Winans' Decisions, 1987) - 4:18
 Giving You the Best That I Got (Single Version) (From Giving You the Best That I Got, 1988) - 3:53
 Good Love (From Giving You the Best That I Got) - 5:33
 Just Because (Single Version) (From Giving You the Best That I Got) - 4:22
 Lead Me Into Love (Single Version) (From Giving You the Best That I Got) - 4:08
 Fairy Tales (Edit) (From Compositions, 1990) - 4:16
 Talk to Me (Single Version) (From Compositions) - 3:53
 Body and Soul (Radio Edit) (From Rhythm of Love, 1994) - 3:58
 I Apologize (Single Version) (From Rhythm of Love) - 4:16
 It's Been You (Single Version) (From Rhythm of Love) - 4:08

Sweet Love: The Very Best of Anita Baker track listing 
 Caught Up In The Rapture (Single Version)
 Giving You The Best That I Got (Single Version)
 Sweet Love
 Body and Soul (Radio Edit)
 Just Because (Long Version)
 I Apologize (Single Version)
 Rhythm of Love
 Soul Inspiration (Single Version)
 Lead Me Into Love (Single Version)
 Angel (Single Version)
 Same Ole Love (365 Days a Year)
 Fairy Tales (Edit)
 Talk To Me (Single Version)
 Good Enough
 No More Tears
 When You Love Someone (Anita Baker/James Ingram)
 You Bring Me Joy
 No One In The World

Certifications

References 

2002 greatest hits albums
Rhino Records compilation albums
Anita Baker compilation albums